The Urdești is a right tributary of the river Elan in Romania. It flows into the Elan in Peicani.

References

Rivers of Romania
Rivers of Vaslui County